BCBST may refer to:

BlueCross BlueShield of Tennessee
Blue Cross Blue Shield Tower